Coonalpyn Lutheran Church (also called Coonalpyn Redeemer Lutheran Church) is a Lutheran church in the Australian state of South Australia located in Coonalpyn.  It is reported as being the largest church in the Coonalpyn Lutheran Parish which has congregations in Tintinara and Meningie.  Built in the 1950s, it was the first Lutheran church in Australia to have both Evangelical Lutheran Church in Australia (ELCA) and United Evangelical Lutheran Church of Australia (UELCA) congregations worship in the same building before the two Synods amalgamated in 1966.

Stained glass window
The stained glass in the Narthex contains in its centre, the Luther rose.  Below, sheafs of wheat and a lamb.  Also, the symbols , Greek for Jesus Christ, conquers (or victorious).

See also
 Lutheran Church of Australia

External links
Redeemer Lutheran Church, Coonalpyn (Coonalpyn Website)

Lutheran churches in Australia
20th-century Lutheran churches
Churches in South Australia
20th-century churches in Australia